X Factor is a Danish television music competition to find new singing talent. This season will be the first season broadcast on TV2. after DR1 announced on August 16, 2017, that Season 11 is the final season broadcast on their channel. Kristian Kjærlund won the competition and Thomas Blachman became the winning mentor for the 3rd time and the 2nd judge to win 2 seasons in a row.

Judges and hosts
Sofie Linde Lauridsen returned as the main host of the show for the 4th time. Thomas Blachman returned as a judge for the 11th time while Remee and Sanne Salomonsen decided to quit. Oh Land and Ankerstjerne replaced them as judges.

Selection process

Auditions took place in Copenhagen, Aarhus and Odense.

5 Chair Challenge
The 5 Chair Challenge returns for season 12. Ankerstjerne will mentor the 15-22s, Blachman has the Over 23s and Oh Land has the Groups/Bands.

The 15 successful acts were:
15-22s: Albina, Benjamin, Live, Patrick, Rasmus 
Over 23s: Andrea, Emil, Frank, Gina, Kristian
Groups: Celina, Danjal & Mathias, Dr. Rolf & Kanylerne, Echo, Maria & Bea, Wild Mountains

Bootcamp

The 6 eliminated acts were:
15-22s: Albina, Rasmus
Over 23s: Emil, Frank
Groups: Celina, Danjal & Mathias, Wild Mountains

Contestants

Key:
 – Winner
 – Runner-up
 – Withdrew

Live shows

Colour key

Contestants' colour key:
{|
|-
| – 15-22s (Ankerstjerne's contestants)
|-
| – Over 23s (Blachman's contestants)
|-
| – Groups (Oh Land's contestants)
|}

Live show details

Week 1 (March 1)
Theme: My Song

Judges' votes to eliminate
 Ankerstjerne: Dr. Rolf & Kanylerne
 Oh Land: Patrick Smith
 Blachman: Dr. Rolf & Kanylerne

Week 2 (March 8)
Theme: Songs from the contestant's birthyears

Judges' votes to eliminate
 Ankerstjerne: Andrea Brøndsted
 Blachman: Patrick Smith
 Oh Land: Andrea Brøndsted

Week 3 (March 15)
Theme:  Songs from 2018/2019
 Musical Guest: Hugo Helmig ("Young Like This")

Judges' votes to eliminate
 Oh Land: Gina Michaells
 Blachman: Echo
 Ankerstjerne: Gina Michaells

Week 4 (March 22)
Theme: Songs from movies

Judges' votes to eliminate
 Ankerstjerne: Echo
 Oh Land: Patrick Smith
 Blachman: Patrick Smith

Week 5 (March 29)
Theme: Nordic songs
 Musical Guests: Alexander Oscar & SVEA ("Complicated")
Group Performance: "Off to See the World"

Maria & Bea withdrew from the competition because of personal reasons, one of them being that Bea's father died, so this week there will be no elimination. However, there will still be a voting but all the publics votes will go through to next week.

Week 6: Semi-final (5 April)
 Theme: One Hit Wonders & Duet with a Special Guest
 Musical Guests: Emil Kruse & Benjamin Hav ("Air Tonight")

The semi-final did not feature a sing-off and instead the act with the fewest public votes, Echo, were automatically eliminated.

This week's publics votes were combined from last weeks votes.

After Echo were eliminated they performed "Somewhere Only We Know" by Keane

Week 7: Final (12 April)
 Theme: Judge's Choice, Producer's Choice and Winner's single
 Musical guests: Alphabeat ("Shadows") Scarlet Pleasure ("24/7")
 Group Performances: ("Giant" performed by X Factor 2019 Contestants) ("Shallow"/"7 Rings"/"My Silver Lining" performed by Malte Ebert, Sofie Linde and Audtionees)

References

Season 12
The X Factor seasons
2019 Danish television seasons